'Mad' Jack Hall (John Hall; also known as Crazy Jack Hall) (1672 – 13 July 1716) was an English Jacobite leader and property owner and a Justice of Peace in Northumberland. He was a member of Clan Hall, a Scottish clan of Norman descent and owned the Otterburn Tower in Redesdale, Northumberland; his initials are still carved over a doorway today.

Early life and background
He was born John Hall, probably at Otterburn Tower, in 1672. His father, John Hall, was born 1624 and died 1692. John "Mad Jack" Hall's wife was Alderman Hutchison's daughter, Mary.  They were married in Newcastle. Marriage Bond found dated 1701 Nov 4, Longbenton Parish.  Hall had served many years as a Justice of Peace in Northumberland.

Rebellion and execution
He was a major figure during the Jacobite rising of 1715.

He was taken into captivity in Preston and was reportedly reprieved at least five times before being executed. While awaiting trial in prison, Hall remarked to a fellow prisoner "Our fathers gained land in Cromwell's time as sequestrators of rebels, now we are going to lose them for being rebels."  He was beheaded at Tyburn for high treason on 13 July 1716.

He was described as a "violent, passionate and indiscreet man" but who was highly generous and beloved by his men.
It was his fiery and energetic temper which procured him the name of "Mad Jack Hall of Otterburn".

References

1716 deaths
English Jacobites
People from Northumberland
Executed Scottish people
People executed at Tyburn
People executed for treason against the United Kingdom
People executed by the Kingdom of Great Britain
Otterburn, Northumberland
1672 births
People executed by the United Kingdom by decapitation